Sir Richard Steele (bap. 12 March 1672 – 1 September 1729) was an Anglo-Irish writer, playwright, and politician, remembered as co-founder, with his friend Joseph Addison, of the magazine The Spectator.

Early life
Steele was born in Dublin, Ireland, in March 1672 to Richard Steele, a wealthy attorney, and Elinor Symes (née Sheyles); his sister Katherine was born the previous year. He was the grandson of Sir William Steele, Lord Chancellor of Ireland and his first wife Elizabeth Godfrey. His father lived at Mountown House, Monkstown, County Dublin. His mother, of whose family background little is known, was described as a woman of "great beauty and noble spirit".

His father died when he was four, and his mother a year later. Steele was largely raised by his uncle and aunt, Henry Gascoigne (secretary to James Butler, 1st Duke of Ormonde), and Lady Katherine Mildmay. 

A member of the Protestant gentry, he was educated at Charterhouse School, where he first met Addison. After starting at Christ Church, Oxford, he went on to Merton College, Oxford, then joined the Life Guards of the Household Cavalry in order to support King William's wars against France. He was commissioned in 1697, and rose to the rank of captain within two years. Steele left the army in 1705, perhaps due to the death of the 34th Foot's commanding officer, Lord Lucas, which limited his opportunities of promotion.

In 1706 Steele was appointed to a position in the household of Prince George of Denmark, consort of Anne, Queen of Great Britain. He also gained the favour of Robert Harley, Earl of Oxford.

In politics
Steele became a Whig Member of Parliament in 1713, for Stockbridge. He was soon expelled for issuing a pamphlet in favour of the Hanoverian succession. When George I of Great Britain came to the throne in the following year, Steele was knighted and given responsibility for the Theatre Royal, Drury Lane, London. He returned to parliament in 1715, for Boroughbridge.

While at Drury Lane, Steele wrote and directed the sentimental comedy The Conscious Lovers, which was an immediate hit. However, he fell out with Addison and with the administration over the Peerage Bill (1719), and in 1724 he retired to his second wife's homeland of Wales, where he spent the remainder of his life.

Steele was a member of the Kit-Kat Club. Both Steele and Addison became closely associated with Child's Coffee-house in St Paul's Churchyard.

Later life

Steele remained in Carmarthen after his wife Mary's death, and was buried there, at St Peter's Church. During the restoration of the church in 2000, his skull was discovered in a lead casket, having previously been accidentally disinterred during the 1870s.

Works

Steele's first published work, The Christian Hero (1701), attempted to point out the differences between perceived and actual masculinity. Written while Steele served in the army, it expressed his idea of a pamphlet of moral instruction. The Christian Hero was ultimately ridiculed for what some thought was hypocrisy because Steele did not necessarily follow his own preaching. He was criticized for publishing a booklet about morals when he himself enjoyed drinking, occasional duelling, and debauchery around town.

Steele wrote a comedy that same year titled The Funeral. This play met with wide success and was performed at Drury Lane, bringing him to the attention of the King and the Whig party. Next, Steele wrote The Lying Lover, one of the first sentimental comedies, but a failure on stage. 

In 1705, Steele wrote The Tender Husband with contributions from Addison, and later that year wrote the prologue to The Mistake, by John Vanbrugh, also an important member of the Whig Kit-Kat Club with Addison and Steele. In 1709, he wrote Isaac Bickerstaff, Physician and Astrologer. He wrote a preface to Addison's 1716 comedy play The Drummer.

Publications

The Tatler, Steele's first journal, first came out on 12 April 1709, and appeared three times a week: on Tuesdays, Thursdays, and Saturdays. Steele wrote this periodical under the pseudonym Isaac Bickerstaff and gave Bickerstaff an entire, fully developed personality.

Steele described his motive in writing The Tatler as "to expose the false arts of life, to pull off the disguises of cunning, vanity, and affectation, and to recommend a general simplicity in our dress, our discourse, and our behaviour". Steele founded the magazine, and although he and Addison collaborated, Steele wrote the majority of the essays; Steele wrote roughly 188 of the 271 total and Addison 42, with 36 representing the pair's collaborative works. While Addison contributed to The Tatler, it is widely regarded as Steele's work.

The Tatler was closed down in early 1711 to avoid the complications of running a Whig publication that had come under Tory attack. Addison and Steele then founded The Spectator in 1711 and also The Guardian in 1713.

Family
In 1705, Steele married a widow, Margaret Stretch, who died in the following year. After Margaret's death, a slave plantation she owned in Barbados came into the ownership of Steele. At her funeral he met his second wife, Mary Scurlock, whom he nicknamed "Prue" and married in 1707. In the course of their courtship and marriage, he wrote over 400 letters to her. Mary died in 1718, at a time when she was considering separation. Their daughter, Elizabeth (Steele's only surviving legitimate child), married John Trevor, 3rd Baron Trevor.

Steele had an illegitimate child, Elizabeth Ousley, whom he later adopted.

In literature
Steele plays a minor role in the novel The History of Henry Esmond by William Makepeace Thackeray. It is during his time with the Life Guards, where he is mostly referred to as Dick the Scholar and makes mention of his friend "Joe Addison". Thackeray depicts Steele in glowing terms as a warm, generous, talented mentor who befriends the title character in his youth and remains loyal to him for years despite their political differences.

See also

List of abolitionist forerunners

References

External links

 
 
 
 
 
 Essays by Steele at Quotidiana.org
 
 Biography, luminarium.org
 Profile, libraryireland.com

1672 births
1729 deaths
Politicians from County Dublin
British magazine founders
British magazine publishers (people)
Irish male dramatists and playwrights
Members of the Parliament of Great Britain for English constituencies
People educated at Charterhouse School
Alumni of Merton College, Oxford
British MPs 1713–1715
British MPs 1715–1722
British MPs 1722–1727
Irish magazine editors
Irish slave owners
17th-century Irish people
18th-century Irish dramatists and playwrights
Members of the Kit-Kat Club
Expelled members of the Parliament of Great Britain
18th-century Irish male writers
Knights Bachelor